Yang Soobin (born November 19, 1993) is a South Korean entertainer known for her mukbang eating shows. She is under contract with CJ E&M.

Career 
Yang rose to social media fame through hosting social eating shows in which she consumes the cuisines of various cultures.

Yang has gained a fan following in Southeast Asian countries especially. She has had several high-turnout fan meetings in Thailand in collaboration with KFC.

Filmography

References

External links 
 
 
 

1994 births
Living people
South Korean entertainers
South Korean YouTubers